Dale Williams may refer to:

 Dale Williams (footballer) (born 1987), Welsh footballer
 Dale Williams (baseball) (1855–1939), Major League Baseball pitcher
 Dale C. Williams (died 1955), member of the California State Senate